The 1949 Five Nations Championship was the twentieth series of the rugby union Five Nations Championship. Including the previous incarnations as the Home Nations and Five Nations, this was the fifty-fifth series of the northern hemisphere rugby union championship. Ten matches were played between 15 January and 26 March. It was contested by England, France, Ireland, Scotland and Wales. Ireland won their 6th title and the Triple Crown.

Participants
The teams involved were:

Table

Results

External links

 The official RBS Six Nations Site
 Amateur footage by Norman Hodgson of matches and buildup, now in the Raidió Teilifís Éireann archives: Wales–Ireland, Ireland–France

Six Nations Championship seasons
Five Nations
Five Nations
Five Nations
Five Nations
Five Nations
Five Nations
Five Nations
Five Nations
Five Nations